The 1976 California Golden Bears football team was an American football team that represented the University of California, Berkeley during the 1976 NCAA Division I football season.	Under head coach Mike White, the team compiled an overall record of 5–6 and 3–4 in conference.

The quarterback and leader of the previous season's team was Joe Roth. Because of that outstanding season he was one of the Heisman Trophy candidates at the beginning of the season. He had a great start, however halfway through it his performance started to drop. Unknown to almost everyone, Roth was diagnosed with melanoma the most dangerous form of skin cancer. Only coach White and his closest friends knew about it. With Roth continuing to play he still had a strong season and was named an All-American. His last game was in January 1977 at an all-star game in Japan and he died several weeks later in Berkeley. His former locker is dedicated in his honor and the annual home game against UCLA or USC is known as the Joe Roth game.

Schedule

Roster
OT Ted Albrecht
LB Jeff Barnes
QB Fred Besana
PK Jim Breech
TE George Freitas
DB Anthony Green
LB Phil Heck
DB Ken McAllister
OG Greg Peters
QB Joe Roth
LB Burt Toler
WR Wesley Walker

Draft picks
The following players were claimed in the 1977 NFL Draft.

References

California
California Golden Bears football seasons
California Golden Bears football